Dr. Hans Gaffron was born in Lima, Peru, on  May 17, 1902, and was a son of the German physician Eduard Gaffron and his wife Hedwig von Gevekot.

He was one of the earlier researchers trying to elucidate the mechanistic and biochemical details of photosynthesis and plant metabolism. His most notable finding was the discovery of a process whereby unicellular green algae can produce molecular Hydrogen (H2) in the presence of light, and that the precursors were derived from photosynthetic water-splitting. Applications based on his work have led to many efforts to develop H2 as a renewable biofuel.

Works
Research in Photosynthesis. New York, Interscience Publ., 1957. 
Photosynthesis. Boston, Heath, 1965.

Notes

References
"Hydrogen metabolism of green algae: discovery and early research a tribute to Hans Gaffron"; Govindjee, J.T. Beatty, H. Gest, J.F. Allen. Discoveries in Photosynthesis Springer, 2006. , pp. 119–129
"Hans Gaffron" in Reinhard Rürup, Schicksale und Karrieren: Gedenkbuch für die von den Nationalsozialisten aus der Kaiser-wilhelm-gesellschaft Vertriebenen Forscherinnen und Forscher, Wallstein Verlag, 2008. 

1902 births
1979 deaths
Peruvian emigrants to the United States